Kalve is a Latvian surname and word meaning "smithy" (a place where a blacksmith works). It may refer to:

Ernests Kalve (born 1987), a Latvian former professional basketball player and assistant coach for BK Ogre
SK Kalve, a Latvian rugby club based in Riga. 
Kalve, Uttara Kannada, settlement in Uttara Kannada, India

Surnames of Latvian origin